Coleophora treskaensis is a moth of the family Coleophoridae. It is found in Spain, France, Italy, North Macedonia, Afghanistan, Turkestan and Uzbekistan.

The wingspan is over 7 mm.

The larvae feed on Casignetella and Artemisia species. They create a silky case which is fairly uniform in width. The anterior end slightly down-curved and the surface of the case is entirely covered with sand particles. The valve is three-sided, short, rounded and poorly visible. It has a length of about 4 mm. Larvae can be found in May.

References

treskaensis
Moths of Europe
Moths of Asia
Moths described in 1967